This page shows the final results of the Judo Competition at the 1996 Summer Olympics in Atlanta.

Medal table

Medal summary

Men's events

Women's events

Participating nations

References

External links
 
 International Olympic Committee results database
 Videos of the 1996 Judo Summer Olympics

 
1996 Summer Olympics events
O
1996
Judo competitions in the United States